Tomasz "Giraffe" Narkun (born December 3, 1989) is a Polish mixed martial artist currently competing for KSW. A professional MMA competitor since 2009, he is the former KSW Light Heavyweight Champion and has also competed for M-1 Global, where he is the former Light Heavyweight Champion. He is currently ranked #3 in the KSW Light Heavyweight rankings.

Background
He has, however, earned respect for his tactical and defensive capabilities. Gegard "Dreamcatcher" Mousasi, a regular training partner of Narkun, has said of Narkun: "Tactically and technically he has reached a very high level". Mousasi has also stated his belief that Narkun "is the future light heavyweight champion".

Career

Early career
Narkun made his professional MMA debut in 2009, winning via armbar submission in the first round.

M-1 Global
In 2010 Narkun appeared for M-1 Global at their Western Europe Selections Light Heavyweight Tournament in 2010. Narkun won his first two bouts with relative ease; submitting each opponent within a minute of the first round. In the Tournament Final in July, Narkun faced Georgian David Tkeshelashvili, winning again via first-round submission. This also awarded Narkun the M-1 Global Light Heavyweight Championship belt.

Narkun next faced Vyacheslav Vasilevsky in his first title defense on December 10, 2010. Narkun was handed his first professional loss via second-round TKO after Narkun's corner threw in the towel.

At the weigh-ins for M-1 Challenge 28 in Russia, for his fight against Saparbek Safarov, both fighters ended up slapping each other. At first it appeared to be a joke, but when Safarov threw a right hook at Narkun, M-1 officials intervened. Safarov was disqualified from the event.

Narkun fought only once in 2011; winning via first-round submission; this would be his last fight under the M-1 Global banner. After not returning to the cage until 2013, Narkun won his next three fights via submission before signing with KSW in his native Poland.

KSW
Narkun made his promotional debut against Brazilian veteran Charles Andrade at KSW 27 on May 17, 2014. He won via kneebar submission in the first round.

KSW Light Heavyweight Champion
Narkun returned to face Croatian Goran Reljic at KSW 29. Narkun was defeated via majority decision. In 2015, Narkun defeated Karol Celinski via first-round rear-naked choke before being given a rematch with Reljic, who had since defeated Attila Végh to become KSW Light Heavyweight Champion, at KSW 32. Narkun won via first-round knockout, becoming the KSW Light Heavyweight Champion.

After defeating Reljic in their rematch for the belt, Narkun had his first title defense against Brazilian Cassio "Jacare" de Oliveira at KSW 34 in early 2016, and then defeated Sokoudjou for his second defense in October of that year. For his third defense, Narkun defeated Marcin Wojicik via triangle choke with just a second left in the first round at KSW 39: Colosseum.

At KSW 42, Narkun prepared for a non-title bout against Mamed Khalidov, the former KSW Middleweight Champion. The pair met at a Catchweight of 203 lbs. After getting knocked down twice in the first round, Narkun was able to regroup, he won via triangle choke submission in the third round; breaking Khalidov's 15-fight unbeaten streak. The pair met again at KSW 46 on December 1, 2018. Narkun won again, this time via unanimous decision after three rounds.

Narkun next challenged KSW Heavyweight Champion and former UFC veteran Phil De Fries for his title at KSW 47 on March 23, 2019. Narkun lost via unanimous decision.

Narkun next defended his Light Heavyweight Championship at KSW 50: London against Przemysław Mysiala, winning via guillotine choke submission in the first round.

Narkun faced Ivan Erslan at KSW 56: Polska vs. Chorwacja on November 14, 2020. He defended his title, winning the fight via second round submission.

Narkun rematched Phil De Fries on April 24, 2021 at KSW 60: De Fries vs. Narkun 2 for the KSW Heavyweight Championship. The pair previously met on March 23, 2019 in the main event at KSW 47: The X-Warriors, where De Fries defeated Narkun by unanimous decision and defended his KSW heavyweight title. He lost the bout in the second round via ground and pound. 

Narkun faced Ibragim Chuzhigaev on January 15, 2022 at KSW 66: Ziółkowski vs. Mańkowski. Narkun lost via unanimous decision, ending his reign as the Light Heavyweight champion.

Post Title Reign 
In his first appearance after losing the belt, Narkun faced Henrique da Silva on October 14, 2022 at KSW 75: Ruchała vs. Stasiak. After dominating on the ground in the first round, Narkun was knocked out via a front kick 28 seconds into the second round.

Championships and accomplishments

Mixed martial arts 
Konfrontacja Sztuk Walki
KSW Light Heavyweight Championship (One time)
Five Successful Title Defenses
Fight of the Night (Two times) vs. Mamed Khalidov and Ibragim Chuzhigaev 
Submission of the Night (One times) vs. Przemyslaw Mysiala (KSW 50) 
European MMA
EUMMA Light Heavyweight Championship (One time)
M-1 Global
2010 M-1 Global Western Europe Selection Tournament Winner
Super League of MMA
Fight of the Night (One time)
Submission of the Night (One time)

Grappling 

 2012: ADCC European Championship - 1st place in 99 kg category (Ljubljana)
 2014: ADCC European Championship - 1st place in 99 kg category (Sofia)

Mixed martial arts record

|-
|Loss
|align=center|18–6
|Henrique da Silva
|KO (front kick)
|KSW 75: Ruchała vs. Stasiak
|
|align=center|2
|align=center|0:28
|Nowy Sącz, Poland
|
|-
|Loss
|align=center|18–5
| Ibragim Chuzhigaev
| Decision (unanimous)
| KSW 66: Ziółkowski vs. Mańkowski
| 
| align=center | 5
| align=center | 5:00
| Szczecin, Poland
|
|-
|Loss
|align=center|18–4
|Phil De Fries
|TKO (punches)
|KSW 60: De Fries vs. Narkun 2
|
|align=center|2
|align=center|3:37
|Łódź, Poland
|
|-
| Win
|align=center| 18–3
| Ivan Erslan
|Submission (rear-naked choke)
|KSW 56: Materla vs. Soldić
|
|align=center|2
|align=center|0:51
|Łódź, Poland
|
|-
|-
| Win
| align=center| 17–3
| Przemysław Mysiala
|  Submission (guillotine choke)
|KSW 50: London
|  
| align=center| 1
| align=center| 4:03
| London, England
|
|-
|-
|  Loss
| align=center| 16–3
|Phil De Fries
|  Decision (unanimous)
|KSW 47: The X-Warriors
|  
| align=center|5
| align=center| 5:00
| Łódź, Poland
|
|-
|-
| Win
| align=center|16–2
| Mamed Khalidov
| Decision (unanimous)
| KSW 46: Khalidov vs. Narkun 2
| 
| align=center| 3
| align=center| 5:00
| Gliwice, Poland
|
|-
| Win
| align=center|15–2
| Mamed Khalidov
| Submission (triangle choke)
| KSW 42: Khalidov vs. Narkun
| 
| align=center|3
| align=center|1:18
| Łódź, Poland
|
|-
| Win
| align=center|14–2
| Marcin Wójcik
| Submission (triangle choke)
| KSW 39: Colosseum
| 
| align=center|1
| align=center|4:59
| Warsaw, Poland
|
|-
|-
|Win
|align=center|13–2
| Rameau Thierry Sokoudjou
|TKO (punches)
|KSW 36: Materla vs. Palhares
|
|align=center|1
|align=center|4:38
| Zielona Gora, Poland
|
|-
| Win
| align=center| 12–2
| Cassio Barbosa de Oliveira
| TKO (knee and punches)
| KSW 34: New Order
| 
| align=center| 1
| align=center| 1:46
| Warsaw, Poland
| 
|-
| Win
| align=center| 11–2
| Goran Reljic
| KO (punches)
| KSW 32: Road to Wembley
| 
| align=center| 1
| align=center| 1:55
| London, England
| 
|-
| Win
| align=center| 10–2
| Karol Celinski
| Submission (rear-naked choke)
| KSW 31: Materla vs. Drwal
| 
| align=center| 1
| align=center| 2:17
| Gdańsk, Poland
|
|-
| Loss
| align=center| 9–2
| Goran Reljic
| Decision (majority)
| KSW 29: Reload
| 
| align=center| 3
| align=center| 5:00
| Kraków, Poland
|
|-
| Win
| align=center| 9–1
| Charles Andrade
| Submission (kneebar)
| KSW 27: Cage Time
| 
| align=center| 1
| align=center| 1:02
| Gdańsk, Poland
|
|-
| Win
| align=center| 8–1
| Simon Carlsen
| Submission (armbar)
| EMMA 7: European MMA 7
| 
| align=center| 2
| align=center| 3:30
| Aarhus, Denmark
| 
|-
| Win
| align=center| 7–1
| Michal Gutowski
| Submission (rear-naked choke)
| XCage: Extreme Cage 5
| 
| align=center| 2
| align=center| 3:30
| Toruń, Poland
|
|-
| Win
| align=center| 6–1
| Rafal Zawidzki
| Submission (guillotine choke)
| Super League Mixed Martial Arts
| 
| align=center| 1
| align=center| 3:45
| Warsaw, Poland
| 
|-
| Win
| align=center| 5–1
| Shamil Tinagadjiev
| Submission (triangle choke)
| M-1 Challenge 23: Guram vs. Grishin
| 
| align=center| 1
| align=center| 3:33
| Moscow, Russia
|
|-
| Loss
| align=center| 4–1
| Vyacheslav Vasilevsky
| TKO (retirement)
| M-1 Challenge 22: Narkun vs. Vasilevsky
| 
| align=center| 2
| align=center| 2:20
| Moscow, Russia
| .
|-
| Win
| align=center| 4–0
| David Tkeshelashvili
| Submission (rear-naked choke)
| M-1 Selection 2010: Eastern Europe Finals
| 
| align=center| 1
| align=center| 1:50
| Moscow, Russia
| 
|-
| Win
| align=center| 3–0
| Timo Karttunen
| Submission (triangle/armbar)
| M-1 Selection 2010: Western Europe Round 3
| 
| align=center| 1
| align=center| 0:49
| Helsinki, Finland
|
|-
| Win
| align=center| 2–0
| Olutobi Ayodeji Kalejaiye
| Submission (rear-naked choke)
| M-1 Selection 2010: Western Europe Round 2
| 
| align=center| 1
| align=center| 0:52
| Weesp, Netherlands
|
|-
| Win
| align=center| 1–0
| Daniel Biskupic
| Submission (armbar)
| FCB 14: Fight Club Berlin 14
| 
| align=center| 1
| align=center| N/A
| Berlin, Germany
|

Except where otherwise indicated, details provided in the record box are taken from Sherdog

See also
 List of current KSW fighters
 List of male mixed martial artists

References

External links

Living people
1989 births
Polish male mixed martial artists
Light heavyweight mixed martial artists
Mixed martial artists utilizing Brazilian jiu-jitsu
Polish practitioners of Brazilian jiu-jitsu
People awarded a black belt in Brazilian jiu-jitsu
Place of birth missing (living people)